Lake station is a below-grade light rail station on the L Line of the Los Angeles Metro Rail system. It is located in the median of Interstate 210 (Foothill Freeway), below North Lake Avenue, after which the station is named, in Pasadena, California. The light rail station opened on July 26, 2003, as part of the original Gold Line, then known as the "Pasadena Metro Blue Line" project. This station and all the other original and Foothill Extension stations will be part of the A Line upon completion of the Regional Connector project in 2023.

It is one of the Gold Line stations near the Rose Parade route on Colorado Boulevard and is used by people coming to see the parade on New Year's Day.

This station features station art called Everyday People, created by artist Pat Ward Williams.  This station has a parking lot with 22 paid reserved spaces.

Service

Station layout

Hours and frequency

Connections 
, the following connections are available:
Los Angeles Metro Bus: 
Pasadena Transit: 20, 40
LADOT Commuter Express:

Notable places nearby 
The station is within walking distance of the following notable places:
 Pasadena Playhouse District

References

External links

L Line (Los Angeles Metro) stations
Transportation in Pasadena, California
Altadena, California
Railway stations in the United States opened in 2003
2003 establishments in California